Barry Cox is a British-Chinese pop singer.

He has performed in the United Kingdom, Hong Kong, China, Macau, Malaysia and Singapore, and has taken part in commercials, theatrical performances, film, TV and radio shows. In 2008, he completed his first single “Feel the Love” which was recorded by Shlepp Entertainment Limited. In 2013 he signed with Hong Kong TVB as a professional actor.

On Monday 2 January 2023 Cox appeared as a guest on BBC Radio Merseyside's Chinese programme 'Orient Express', in which he talked about his career and announced that he is working on a book about his life and his work.

Discography

Singles

TV series
2014: ICAC Investigators
2014 como Dallas (Ep.4)
2014: The Ultimate Addiction como Antonio Cruz
2015: Eye in the Sky como Hung Chun-ying

References

Living people
21st-century Hong Kong male actors
21st-century Hong Kong male singers
Cantopop singers
Hong Kong Mandopop singers
Hong Kong male television actors
Hong Kong male film actors
Hong Kong television presenters
Hong Kong idols
Year of birth missing (living people)